A diocesan museum is a museum for an ecclesiastical diocese, a geographically-based division of the Christian Church.

Austria:

 Diocesan Museum, Graz, Styria
 Gurk Treasury, Carinthia
 Diocesan Museum, Linz, Upper Austria
 Cathedral Museum Salzburg, Salzburg state (Diocesan and Cathedral Chapter collections)
 Diocesan Museum, St. Pölten, Lower Austria
 Cathedral and Diocesan Museum, Vienna
 Evangelical Diocesan Museum, Burgenland in the Evangelical Prayer House in the Mönchhof Village Museum
 Evangelical Diocesan Museum, Fresach in Fresach, Carinthia
 Evangelical Diocesan Museum, Styria in Murau

Germany:
 Augustiner Museum Freiburg, Diocesan Museum, for the Archbishopric of Freiburg
 Diocesan Museum, Bamberg
 Kolumba, Archepiscopal Diocesan Museum, Cologne
 Diocesan Museum, Eichstätt
 Domberg Museum, Freising
 Cathedral Museum, Fulda
 Cathedral Museum, Hildesheim
 Cathedral and Diocesan Museum, Mainz
 Diocesan Museum, Osnabrück
 Archepiscopal Diocesan Museum, and Cathedral Treasury, Paderborn 
 Bishopric Museums, Regensburg 
 Diocesan Museum, Rottenburg
Italy:
 Diocesan Museum, Brixen
 Diocesan Museum (Cortona)
Spain:

 Diocesan Museum of Sacred Art, Álava (es)
 Diocesan Museum, Albarracín (es)
 Diocesan Museum, Alcalá de Henares (es)
 Diocesan Museum, Barbastro
 Diocesan Museum, Barcelona (ca)
 Diocesan Museum of Sacred Art, Bilbao (es)
 Cathedral [and Diocesan] Museum, Burgo de Osma
 Co-cathedral and Diocesan Museum, Cáceres
 Diocesan Museum, Calahorra
 Diocesan Museum, Ciudad Real
 Diocesan and Cathedral Museum, Ciudad Rodrigo (es)
 Diocesan Museum, Córdoba (es)
 Diocesan Museum, Cuenca (es)
 Diocesan Museum, Ibiza
 Diocesan Museum, Huelva (es)
 Diocesan Museum, Huesca (es)
 Diocesan Museum, Jaca (es)
 Cathedral [and Diocesan] Museum, Jaén (es)
 Diocesan Museum, La Seu d'Urgell (ca)
 Diocesan Museum of Sacred Art, Las Palmas de Gran Canaria (es)
 Diocesan and Cathedral Museum, León (es)
 Diocesan and Comarcal Lleida Museum, Lleida
 Diocesan and Cathedral Museum, Lugo
 Diocesan Museum of Sacred Art, Moguer (es)
 Cathedral and Diocesan Museum, Mondoñedo (gl)
 Diocesan Museum of Sacred Art, Orihuela (es)
 Church Museum, Oviedo (es)
 Diocesan Museum, Palencia (es)
 Diocesan Museum, Palma de Mallorca (ca)
Cathedral and Diocesan Museum, Pamplona
 Diocesan Museum, Salamanca (es)
 Diocesan Museum, San Sebastián
 Regina Coeli Diocesan Museum, Santillana del Mar (es)
 Cathedral Museum, Segorbe
 Diocesan Museum of Ancient Art, Sigüenza (es)
 Diocesan and Regional Museum, Solsona (ca)
 Diocesan Museum, Tarragona (ca)
 [Diocesan] Museum of Sacred Art, Teruel
 Diocesan Museum, Tui, Spain
 Diocesan and Cathedral Museum, Valencia (es)
 Diocesan and Cathedral Museum, Valladolid (es)
 Episcopal Museum, Vic (ca)
 Diocesan Museum, Zamora (es)
 Alma Mater Museum [Diocesan Museum], Zaragoza (es)

See also 
Early Christian art and architecture
Vatican Museums

References

External links 
 kirchliche-museen.org – Overview for Central Europe
 museosdelaiglesia.es – Website of the Association of Museologists of the Roman Catholic Church in Spain

Lists of museums by subject